The history of Tokyo shows the growth of Japan's largest urban center. The eastern part of Tokyo occupies land in the Kantō region that together with the modern-day Saitama Prefecture, the city of Kawasaki and the eastern part of Yokohama make up Musashi; one of the provinces under the ritsuryō system.

The 23 special wards, including Chiyoda, Chuo, Minato, Shibuya and Shinjuku wards, form the central part of Tokyo. Western Tokyo occupies the Tama district. Tokyo's oldest Buddhist temple is Sensō-ji in Asakusa, founded in 628. The name of Edo first appears in the 12th century.

Sengoku period
The construction of Edo Castle by Ōta Dōkan, a vassal of Uesugi Mochitomo, began in 1457 during the Muromachi period in what is now the East Garden of the Imperial Palace. Shrines and temples grew up nearby, and merchants developed businesses and opened ferry and shipping routes. Hōjō Ujitsuna entered Edo Castle in 1524.

Momoyama period
In 1590, Tokugawa Ieyasu established himself in Edo.

Edo or Tokugawa  period, 1603–1868

By 1590, when the military leader Tokugawa Ieyasu selected Edo as his military headquarters, the settlement surrounding Edojuku boasted a mere hundred thatch-roofed cottages. Ieyasu assembled warriors and craftsmen, fortified the Edojuku castle with moats and bridges, and built up the town.
The Edo period (Edo jidai) began when Tokugawa Ieyasu became shōgun in 1603.  He was the effective ruler of Japan, and his Edo became a powerful and flourishing city as the effective national capital. However, Japan's imperial seat and official capital remained in Kyoto, but the Emperor was virtually powerless.

The outer enclosures of Edo Castle were completed in 1606,  and it continues to remain at the core of the city.

This period was marked by continuous growth which was interrupted by natural disasters, including fires, earthquakes and floods.  Fires were so commonplace that they came to be called the "blossoms of Edo".
In 1657, the Great Fire of Meireki destroyed much of the city; and another disastrous fire in 1668 lasted for 45 days.

Political system

The Tokugawa political system rested on both feudal and bureaucratic controls, so that Tokyo lacked a unitary administration. The typical urban social order was composed of warriors, peasants, artisans, and businessmen, the latter two classes organized in officially sanctioned guilds whose number increased with trade and population growth. Because businessmen were excluded from government office, they nurtured a culture of entertainment, making Edo a cultural as well as a political and economic center.

Edo was the world's largest city in the 18th century, with a population of over one million in 1800. Edo's lead in social change and economic growth impacted all of Japan during the 1650–1860 era. Edo's demand for human and material resources attracted immigrants,  created new markets and marketing patterns, and generated improved standards of performance and new tastes for a higher standard of living.

Burakumin outcast 

Tokugawa Edo was very harsh toward outcast groups.  Edo imposed severe restrictions on people known as "kawata", "eta" and "hinin" (literally "nonhuman").  Not only were the laws harshly enforced, but officials created the Burakumin outcast order covering all of Japan. Intense popular fear of "pollution" and "impurity" helped determine who was targeted for discrimination, and in turn provided the foundation for Japan's elaborate official system of prejudice and intolerance.

Local land ownership and administration
The city had two types of land ownership: bukechi and chochi. Bukechi, the samurai system, was used for residential property.  Sales and purchases were not allowed, so the value of a parcel of land was undeterminable. Chochi was the system used by ordinary townspeople, both merchants and craftsmen, for both residential and commercial purposes. Chochi recognized private ownership - land had a known value.

In the 1870s the Meiji reformers closed out the samurai system, putting bukechi land under the chochi rules, thereby ending an important dimension of feudal class divisions. There was no central authority in Tokyo, but rather a complex system of local districts.  Local decision-making in each district was headed by two men called the machi bugyó. They issued administrative orders to the next level, comprising three full-time hereditary administrators, called toshiyori.

The nanushi, or headmen, were in charge of wards made up of about a dozen machi. After 1720, the nanushi were organized into 20 guilds. They had the difficult challenge of protecting the overcrowded city, built of flimsy wood houses - in 1657 a huge fire destroying two thirds of Edo, causing 100,000 deaths. Such a large city could not feed itself, so the government organized an elaborate system of granaries. The Machikaisho was a warehouse for rice storage that was set up during the Kansei in the reform period, 1787–33. It increased the power of the government, while providing relief for poor city dwellers and low-interest loans to landowners.

Schools
Terakoya, private educational institutions, functioned as schools for children of commoners. The terakoya attendance rate reached 70% in the capital Edo at the end of the 18th century and the beginning of the 19th century. The terakoya system kept Tokyo's literacy rate as high as around 70–86%, which is considerably higher than numbers of European cities in that time.

Under Tokugawa rule, a limited number of elite schools taught values of literary civilization to encourage discipline within the class of hereditarily-qualified office holders. Schools were storehouses of texts and patronized scholars, serving as waystations for bureaucratic candidates lacking office and for domainal students. the leading schools included Shoheiko (1790) for the study of Confucian classics, Wagaku-kodansho (1793) for Japanese classics, Kaiseigo (1885) for western learning, and Igakukan (1863) for the study of occidental medicine. In 1877 they merged to form Tokyo University.

Significant events
1707 The Hōei eruption of Mount Fuji spewed ash on Edo.
1721 Edo is the world's largest city with an estimated population of 1.1 million.
1772 The Great Meiwa Fire caused an estimated 6,000 casualties.
1855 The Great Edo earthquake caused considerable damage.
1860 Ii Naosuke, who favored opening Japan to the West, was assassinated by an anti-foreign rebel samurai. The late bakumatsu era saw an increase in political activity in Edo and strife over the question of relations with the West.
1867 Japan's last shōgun, Tokugawa Yoshinobu caused an end to the shogunate when he surrendered power to the emperor.
1868 The emperor traveled to Tokyo for the first time, and Edo Castle became the Imperial palace.<ref>Ponsonby-Fane, Richard A. B. (1956). Kyoto: The Old Capital of Japan, 794–1869, p. 328.</ref>

Meiji Restoration

The Imperial Army seized Edo and ended the Tokugawa regime in 1868.  After defeating the Tokugawa forces at Toba-Fushimi in January, Imperial forces captured Edo and exiled the Tokugawa leadership. Edo was renamed Tokyo ["the eastern capital"] and the Emperor Meiji, aged 16, was brought from Kyoto and enthroned in the palace. The urban poor played little role in the upheaval, but they grumbled about the rising prices of rice and fish and the downfall of the old bakufu leadership. Their cynical and often humorous commentary on the transition appeared in newspapers, broadsheets, handbills, and woodblock prints.

Education

In the Meiji Era, consolidation of the government schools into the Tokyo Imperial University in 1877 brought a strong emphasis upon introducing western forms of expertise, especially in science and technology. Consultants were brought in from Europe and the United States. Kikuchi Dairoku (1855–1917), a mathematician educated at Cambridge and London, became president.  Advanced schools were transformed into centers of research and publication by experts often possessing national reputation.  Tight control over education was exercised by the Ministry of Education.

The university soon played a role in national politics. Japanese nationalism became the centerpiece of education, and university scholars began to enter public debate as experts in many areas. The study of law developed rapidly at Tokyo University, making the university then (and now) the foremost supplier of bureaucratic office holders. By the 1880s the university had become an invaluable political instrument to the government bureaucracy.

Urban planning

With the end of sankin-kōtai, the daimyōs and their retinue left the city—a drain of an estimated 360,000 people—and the merchants and other workers left as well.  This and the warfare surrounding the Restoration brought the population down from a high of 1.3 million in the early 19th century to about 500,000 in 1869.  It took another twenty years for the population to return to its pre-Restoration peak.  The population reached 2 million in 1905. In the 1870s and 1880s the nation's  leaders engaged in intense discussions about the future of the capital of Tokyo.

In 1869–71 officials experimented with the "Fifty-Ward System" to strengthen control over the population. It kept some of the old order, ended the control of local dignitaries over the wards. In 1871 the Large and Small Ward System was enacted, giving central officials control over local decisions. There was a new emphasis on citywide standards of beautification, as well as improving the infrastructure and services seen as essential to maintenance and growth of the city. City planners spoke the language of progress. Phillips (1996) examines the course taken by urban leaders of the first decades of the Meiji period in establishing planning policy, using planning documents, transcripts of planning committees, and on architectural and urban design data from completed urban improvement projects in Tokyo. Phillips (1996) argues that Japan's new commitment to  modernization, transformed older notions of cities and city planning practices.

The first decades of the Meiji period revealed a lack of elite consensus about the proper path to modernity. Rather than reject all traditional approaches to planning, planners incorporated elements into their new planning methods.  Modernity in the Japanese context did not require dismantling pre-existing urban structures. Instead, it represented a marriage of the political motivations of the country's leaders with the modern urban needs for improved transportation networks and zoning mechanisms. Public opinion also mattered, and had a certain impact on how the planners put their theories and practice.

Museums
Meiji cultural officials modeled their policies after Berlin, London and Paris. Tokyo was to become a national capital and repository of the greatest cultural treasures from across the land. For example, the "Horyuji Homotsukan" [Hall of Horyuji Treasures] of the Tokyo National Museum displayed representative items from the Horyuji temple in Nara Prefecture.  Machida Hisanari (1839–97), was the "father" of the National Museum, and used the collection to promote the restored monarchy.

Parks
Urban parks as a source of beauty, relaxation and recreation became high priority for European and American cities planners in the mid-19th century. The Meiji leadership introduced its version of  the urban public park within the context of its goal of modernizing Tokyo into a world-class city by Western standards. They began with two representative sites: one in the northern district with Tokugawa connections; and a parade ground next to the palace. The hill became a park used for public celebration, while the parade ground was elaborately transformed into a consciously fashioned recreational space. They provided models for numerous other parks around the city.

1923 Kanto earthquake

At noon on Saturday September 1, 1923, the earthquake hit, registering 8.3 on the Richter scale. Seismologists found the epicentre was in Sagami Bay, about 80 km south of Tokyo, where a 100- by 100-kilometer segment of the Philippine oceanic plate broke against the Eurasian continental plate, releasing a massive amount of tectonic energy. Minutes later came the dreaded huge tsunami, with a height of 12 meters. In Yokohama, a city built on landfill, practically every structure was ruined. As fires swept across Tokyo, 75% of all buildings suffered severe structural damage. The quake cut most of the water mains. Of the population of 4.5 million, 2% to 3% were killed. Two million people were homeless. Two per cent of Japan's total national wealth was destroyed.Joshua Hammer,  Yokohama Burning: The Deadly 1923 Earthquake and Fire that Helped Forge the Path to World War II (2006) excerpt and text search Emergency food and clothing was provided by an international relief effort.

Angry survivors took revenge on resident Koreans, killing several thousand. The fierce hatred was fueled by rumors of Korean wrongdoing and because of their distinct Korean identity, rather than simply because they were not Japanese. As Allen notes, the Japanese colonial occupation of Korea provided the backdrop to this extreme example of the explosion of racial prejudice into violence, based on a history of antagonism. To be a Korean in 1923 Japan was to be not only despised, but also threatened and potentially killed.

Japanese commentators interpreted the disaster as an act of divine punishment to admonish the Japanese people for their self-centered, immoral, and extravagant lifestyles. In the long run, the response to the disaster was a strong sense that Japan had been given an unparalleled opportunity to rebuild the city, and to rebuild Japanese values. In reconstructing the city, the nation and the Japanese people, the earthquake fostered a culture of catastrophe and reconstruction that amplified discourses of moral degeneracy and national renovation in interwar Japan.

In the rebuilding process, former one- and two-story wood structures were replaced by modern five- and six-story buildings of concrete and steel in the European style. Straight new motorways replaced twisting narrow streets. The first underground subway system opened in 1927 and a new airport in 1931. At 6.36 million, the city's population in 1935 was larger than before the earthquake; it was nearly as large as London or New York. The "secondary centers" or "satellite cities" (fukutoshin) of Shinjuku, Shibuya, and Ikebukuro grew rapidly. They and the entire surrounding Tokyo prefecture was incorporated into the city in 1943.

In contrast to London, where typhoid fever had been steadily declining since the 1870s, the rate in Tokyo remained high, more so in the upper-class residential northern and western districts than in the densely populated working-class eastern district. An explanation is the decline of waste disposal, which became particularly serious in the northern and western districts when traditional methods of waste disposal collapsed due to urbanization. The 1923 earthquake led to record high morbidity due to unsanitary conditions following the earthquake, it prompted the establishment of antityphoid measures and the building of urban infrastructure.

Significant events
1868 With the Meiji Restoration, the ruler of Japan shifts from the shōgun to an oligarchy ruling under the banner of the emperor.
1869 Emperor Meiji relocates to Tokyo and makes Edo Castle the Imperial Palace. However, as the capital was never officially "transferred" from Kyoto to Tokyo, the status of Tokyo vis-à-vis Kyoto remains ambiguous See: Capital of Japan. Former samurai from the Satsuma and Chōshū (and other) regions, take crucial roles in the new ruling Meiji oligarchy. A foreigner settlement is established at Tsukiji.
1871 The feudal domain system is replaced by a prefectural system. Tokyo Prefecture is established out of parts of former Musashi Province.
1872 Tokyo Prefecture expands to include what is now the 23 wards.
Tokyo's (and Japan's) first rail line opens between Shimbashi (now Shiodome) and Yokohama
Tokyo National Museum is opened following the Yushima Seido Exposition
1874 Tokyo Metropolitan Police Department is established.
1877 A modern higher education school was opened, forerunner of the University of Tokyo.
1882 Ueno Zoo opens.
1885 The first section of what was to become the Yamanote Line opens between Akabane and Shinagawa Stations. Train stations such as Shibuya and Shinjuku Stations open as a result.
1889 Tokyo City is established with 15 wards.
1893 Three districts from the Tama area of Kanagawa Prefecture are annexed to Tokyo Prefecture
1893 M6.6 Meiji Tokyo earthquake kills 31, injures 157 people
1899 Tsukiji Foreign Settlement is abolished.
1903 The first tram lines was opened.
1905 In protest against the Treaty of Portsmouth after the Russo-Japanese War, the Hibiya Incendiary Incident occurs at Hibiya Park.
1914 Tokyo Station opens.
1920 Meiji Shrine is constructed.
1921 Prime Minister of Japan, Takashi Hara, is assassinated at Tokyo Station.
1923 The Great Kantō earthquake strikes Tokyo, killing at least 70,000 people; thousands of Koreans living there are killed in retaliation.
1924 Ueno Park opens.
1925 The Yamanote Line train line loop is completed when the section between Kanda and Ueno Stations is completed.

Shōwa period 1926–1989

World War II

Tokyo was the center of Japan's government and its industrial and commercial infrastructure. The experience of everyday life in Tokyo dramatically changed with munitions-based heavy industrialization and the loss of liberties and urban culture as the state mobilized for total war.

Tokyo became the first Japanese city to be bombed in World War II on April 18, 1942, in the Doolittle Raid.

The sensitive issue of how to defend the capital from air attack became a pressing concern for urban planners, government officials, and even fiction writers. While the Japanese government assigned Tokyoites the responsibility of protecting the Imperial capital, devastating American firebombing raids revealed in an instant the impossibility of carrying out such a task.

Tokyo was bombed repeatedly after November 1944 as the Americans opened air bases in the Mariana Islands that were in range. The most stunning results came on the night of March 9–10, 1945. The U.S. Army Air Forces sent 325 B-29s over Tokyo. They came in at low level and were unescorted because the Japanese air defense system was totally inadequate. They dropped 1,665 tons of incendiary bombs containing a jelly-like mixture of rubber, lye, and coconut oil, all blended with gasoline. An unstoppable conflagration burned 45 square kilometers and killed over 100,000 people in a matter of minutes. Most of the victims suffocated in bomb shelters when the raging fires consumed the oxygen. One fourth of the buildings in the entire city were destroyed.

The raid marked a turning point in the American strategic air war against Japan. Previously, most methods were "precision" raids that used high explosives against industrial targets. Now, the strategy was to use area raids that used incendiary bombs to burn Japanese cities and kill the workers who kept the war machine going. Leaflets were dropped by the millions to order civilians to evacuate to the towns and rural areas which were not bombed. Half of Tokyo's 7.4 million residents fled. The strategy was similar to the air war against German cities and reflected prewar Air Force strategic planning, which focused on the burning of Tokyo and other industrial and command centers as a way to destroy the enemy's military capability.

After a long interval of silence, private memories of the catastrophic firebombings became public when air raid survivors joined to write a history of the raids. In 2002 the Center of the Tokyo Raids and War Damage museum was built to transmit the experience of war. It is the only public Museum to the city's wartime experience.

Dissolution of Tokyo City

Both Tokyo City and Tokyo Prefecture were replaced in 1943 by a single Tokyo Metropolis (都).  In Tokyo's case, the 35 urban wards were merged into 23, which were transferred to the current Tokyo Metropolis along with the outlying cities of Tokyo Prefecture, such as Machida, Tokyo as well as towns and village units.

Postwar recovery, 1945–1970

The destroyed metropolis became the base from which the United States under Douglas MacArthur administered Japan for six years.

1964 Summer Olympics

The population reached ten million in 1964 as the Summer Olympic Games that year left a deep impact on the national identity of Japan. The nation's wounded psyche and reputation from World War II was significantly healed. Rapid social changes, thematically staged in the Olympic ceremonies, enabled Japan to display an inclusive and comprehensive national pride, and underscored Japan's re-entry into the circle of developed industrial countries. The 1964 ancient arts exhibition put on by the Tokyo National Museum to coincide with the Tokyo Olympics provided an opportunity to promote Japan's traditional culture to foreign visitors and to the Japanese people themselves, as part of an effort to regain normalized status in the international community. Architect Kenzō Tange is most famous for the Yoyogi National Gymnasium, built in 1964 for the Olympics.

Although Japan's foreign-policy was closely linked to the United States during the Cold War, the city of Tokyo hosted the 1964 Summer Olympics in the spirit of peaceful engagement with the entire international community, including the Communist states. Sports were kept entirely separate from politics. Enormous energy and expense was devoted to upgrading the cities physical infrastructure, including new buildings, highways, stadiums, hotels, airports and trains. There was a new satellite to facilitate live international broadcast. The event  proved a great success for the city and for Japan as a whole, with no untoward incidents. Japan's foreign-policy was expanded to include sports diplomacy as the nation sent teams to international competitions across the globe.

1970s and 1980s
The vast majority of large companies, financial institutions, and government agencies continue to maintain their headquarters in the old center of the city, mainly in the Marunouchi area in the Chiyoda Ward.

Land bubble of 1980s

Japan in the 1980s experienced a "bubble" economy, as the stock market index soared from 6000 in 1980 to 40,000 in 1989. Simultaneously, Tokyo experienced a huge increase of urban land prices. This "land bubble" phenomenon led to new strategies in the urban development process. In order to preserve the profitability of real estate schemes, developers used several means of action to increase building density, namely the jiage system and urban renewal procedure. They also experimented with new methods to avoid land purchase, such as land deposit and short-term lease contracts. These new methods of development had a great impact on Tokyo's morphology. 

Skyscrapers and high-rise buildings were built in business zones instead of narrow "pencil buildings"; huge department stores surrounded by public squares flourished in the vicinity of middle-range railway stations; and modern concrete buildings progressively replaced old wooden houses within residential zones. However, this modernization process was not closely controlled by the public authorities, and it produced an anarchic collection of high-rise buildings throughout the capital city that increased road traffic and worsened parking problems.
 
In early-21st-century Tokyo, the construction of luxury residential and commercial towers in neighborhoods along the Sumida River has accelerated dramatically, altering the social composition and cultural images associated with downtown Tokyo. The new buildings stand in contrast to the sinking economy and are markers of the growing gap between rich and poor. They also reflect the pattern of urban construction and destruction as well as the unobtainable desires promised by commodity capitalism.

The Japanese media have featured articles on the escalation of youth crime and discontent, as well as the many forms of corruption that teenagers are exposed to in transformed downtown Tokyo. The 2002 Naoki literary prize was awarded to a book that reacts to both urban development and the problems facing Tokyo adolescents - Ira Ishida's 4-Teen (2002). Ishida shows the effects of Tokyo's transformations on teenage social norms and uses descriptions of urban places to reveal contradictions embedded in these roles. This article examines the context of 4-Teen's publication and the awarding of the Naoki Prize and explores how stories that mix fiction and historical experience provide new ways of viewing the changes in Tokyo.

Significant events
1927 Tokyo's first subway (Ginza Line) opens between Asakusa and Ueno.
1931 Tokyo Airport opens at Haneda, in southern Tokyo.
1932 Five districts and 82 towns and villages are annexed to Tokyo city which then expands to 35 wards.
1936 National Diet Building is completed.
In an attempted coup (the February 26 Incident), nearly 1500 junior officers of the IJA 1st Division occupy the National Diet Building, the Prime Minister's Residence) and other key locations in Tokyo. The coup was suppressed by the Army and Navy within three days.
1942 Tokyo is bombed in the Doolittle Raid, the first American air raid against Japan in World War II
1943 Tokyo Prefecture and Tokyo city merge to form Tokyo Metropolis or Tokyo-to.
1945 Tokyo was heavily bombed, and much of the city was burned to the ground by USAAF B-29 and other aircraft. Extensive tracts of land were leveled both by explosions and subsequent fires. The damage extends to Hachiōji and other cities in western suburbs. From February to March, the Battle of Iwo Jima was fought on Iwo Jima. Due to the heavy death toll and populace fleeing to the countryside, the 1945 Tokyo population was only half that of 1940. From September, Tokyo is under military occupation and governed by the Allied forces, and the Ogasawara Islands (Bonin Islands) was separated to U.S. military occupation. General Douglas MacArthur established the occupation headquarters in what is now the Dai-Ichi Seimei building. The American presence in Tokyo made it an important command and logistics center during the Korean War. Tokyo still hosts Yokota Air Base and a large number of minor U.S. military installations.
1946 The first Central May Day Festival after 1935 was held on the Front Park of Tokyo Imperial Palace.
1947 Tokyo's number of wards is consolidated to 23
 Typhoon Kathleen floods eastern Tokyo.
1948 The International Military Tribunal for the Far East (IMTFE, Tokyo Trial) is concluded. Seven men were executed.
1950 The Capital Construction Law was passed.
1954 The Marunouchi Line, Tokyo's second subway line, opens between Ikebukuro and Ochanomizu.
1957 Tokyo Metropolitan Government completes Ogochi Dam on the Tama River, creating Lake Okutama in Okutama, in northwest Tokyo for drinking water.
1961 Hibiya subway line opens between Minami-Senju and Naka-Okachimachi.
1962 The population of Tokyo exceeds 10,000,000, making it the largest city in the world.
The first line of the Shuto Expressway opens for traffic.
1964 Tōkaidō Shinkansen opens on October 1 in time for the Tokyo Olympic Games starting on October 10.
1967 The first (and thus far, only) left-wing Governor, Ryokichi Minobe was elected, with backing by the Japan Socialist Party and Japanese Communist Party.
1968 The Ogasawara Islands (Bonin Islands) are returned to Japan and become Ogasawara Village, Tokyo.
The Tōmei Expressway is opened, and Tokyo Interchange in Setegaya Ward connects it to the center of Tokyo via the Shuto Expressway.
1971 In the south-western area of Tokyo, Tama New Town accepts its first residents.
1972 Almost all 181 km of Tokyo Toden tram lines are closed, except a short part, now the Toden Arakawa Line.
Takeshi Kitano starts his career in comedy at a strip theater in Asakusa.
1977 Tachikawa Air Force Base reverts to Japan and converted partially into a park.
1978 New Tokyo International Airport (Narita International Airport) in Chiba Prefecture opens. Tokyo International Airport (Haneda Airport) then serves mainly domestic flights.
1979 The 5th G7 summit is held in Tokyo. The conservative Liberal Democratic Party (LDP) recovers the post of governor, with the win of Shunichi Suzuki in elections.
1985 New Ryōgoku Kokugikan opens, used for Sumo.
1986 The bubble economy starts with land prices skyrocketing. Mount Mihara volcano erupts, forcing all residents of Izu Ōshima to temporarily evacuate the island
1988 Tokyo Dome indoor baseball stadium opens.
1989 Emperor Hirohito (Emperor Shōwa) dies in the Tokyo Palace.

Since 1990 

The boom years ended in the 1990s, and the entire nation entered  decades of economic stagnation. Tokyo's real estate bubble burst.  The pessimistic mood was further deepened by the 2011 Tōhoku earthquake and tsunami. Tokyo was not directly damaged, but it suffered from severe shortages of electricity and the economic impact of the earthquake, as complex manufacturing systems were disrupted.

Significant events
1990 The bubble economy collapses, triggering a massive fall in Tokyo land prices.
1991 The new Tokyo Metropolitan Government Building in Shinjuku is completed. The metropolitan government moves from its former offices in Yūrakuchō.
1993 Rainbow Bridge is completed. It supports the development of the waterfront area on Tokyo Bay, Odaiba.
1995 On March 20, the Aum Shinrikyo cult released Sarin nerve gas in the Tokyo subway system; 12 people were killed and thousands affected (see 1995 Tokyo Subway Attacks). Newly elected Tokyo governor Yukio Aoshima cancels the "World City Expo" that was to be held in 1996 in the Odaiba waterfront area.
1999 Conservative Shintaro Ishihara is elected Governor of Tokyo
2000 The Ōedo subway line opens.
Due to a volcanic eruption, all residents of Miyakejima evacuate; they could not return until 2005.
2001 Studio Ghibli opens its Ghibli Museum in Mitaka, in the eastern Tama area.
2003 Shintaro Ishihara is reelected Governor of Tokyo. Roppongi Hills opens.
2005 Tsukuba Express railway line opens.
2007 Completion of Tokyo Midtown (currently the city's tallest high-rise building) and the Tokyo Metro Line 13.
2008 Tokyo 2016 Olympic bid is submitted to the IOC. Tokyo Metro begins the operation of its Fukutoshin Line. The length of subway network is nearly 400 km.
2011 Completion of Tokyo Skytree, Japan's tallest structure (634 m high surpassing the CN Tower in Toronto as the world's tallest free-standing structure). Completion of the renovation of Tokyo Station.
2011 The 2011 Tōhoku earthquake and tsunami that devastated much of the northeastern coast of Honshu was felt in Tokyo. Because of Tokyo's earthquake-resistant infrastructure, direct  damage in the metropolis Tokyo was minor. However the economic life of the city and the nation was seriously disrupted, especially by shortages of electricity.

See also

Edo period
History of Japan
 Timeline of Tokyo

Notes

References
 Cullen, Louis M. (2003). A History of Japan, 1582-1941: Internal and External Worlds. Cambridge: Cambridge University Press. ; ;  OCLC 50694793
 Iwao, Seiichi, Teizō Iyanaga, Susumu Ishii, Shōichirō Yoshida et al. (2002). Dictionnaire historique du Japon. Paris: Maisonneuve & Larose. ;  OCLC 51096469
 Nussbaum, Louis-Frédéric and Käthe Roth. (2005).  Japan encyclopedia. Cambridge: Harvard University Press. ;  OCLC 58053128
 Ponsonby-Fane, Richard Arthur Brabazon. (1956). Kyoto: The Old Capital of Japan, 794-1869. Kyoto: Ponsonby Memorial Society. 
 Titsingh, Isaac. (1834). Nihon Odai Ichiran; ou,  Annales des empereurs du Japon.  Paris: Royal Asiatic Society, Oriental Translation Fund of Great Britain and Ireland. OCLC 5850691.

Further reading

 Borland, Janet. "Small parks, big designs: Reconstructed Tokyo's new green spaces, 1923–1931." Urban History 47.1 (2020): 106–125.
 Chong, Doryun, et al. Tokyo, 1955-1970: A New Avant-garde (The Museum of Modern Art, 2012), art history.
 Cybriwsky, Roman.  Historical Dictionary of Tokyo (2011)         excerpt and text search
 Cybriwsky, Roman.  Tokyo: The Shogun's City at the Twenty-first Century'.' (1998). 260 pp.
 Edoin, Hoito.  The Night Tokyo Burned. (1987). 272 pp.  In March 1945
 Emerson, Charles. 1913: In Search of the World Before the Great War (2013) compares Tokyo to 20 major world cities; pp 411–30.
 Fiévé, Nicolas and Paul Waley, eds. Japanese capitals in historical perspective: place, power and memory in Kyoto, Edo and Tokyo (2003)
 Forbes, Andrew; Henley, David (2014). 100 Famous Views of Edo. Chiang Mai: Cognoscenti Books. ASIN: B00HR3RHUY  118 woodblock landscape and genre scenes of mid-19th century Edo. excerpt
 Hastings, Sally Ann. Neighborhood and Nation in Tokyo, 1905–1937 (1995)
 Jones, Sumie et al. eds. A Tokyo Anthology: Literature from Japan’s Modern Metropolis, 1850–1920 (2017); primary sources excerpt
 Kreitman, Paul. "Attacked by excrement: the political ecology of shit in wartime and postwar Tokyo." Environmental History 23#2 (2018): 342-366 online.
 Kumagai, Yoichi, Robert B. Gibson, and Pierre Filion. "Evaluating long-term urban resilience through an examination of the history of green spaces in Tokyo." Local Environment 20.9 (2015): 1018–1039.
 McClain, James L., John M. Merriman and Ugawa Kaoru. Edo and Paris: Urban Life and the State in the Early Modern Era (1997)  excerpt and text search
 Mansfield, Stephen. Tokyo A Cultural History (2009)
 Mansfield, Stephen. Tokyo: A Biography (Tuttle Publishing, 2016).
 Masai, Y. "Tokyo: From a feudal million city to a global supercity," Geographical Review of Japan (1990) 63(B-1): 1–16
 Naito, Akira, and Kazuo Hozumi. Edo, the City that Became Tokyo: An Illustrated History (2003)
Nishiyama, Matsunosuke. Edo Culture: Daily Life and Diversions in Urban Japan, 1600-1868 (1997)
 Novhet, Nohel, and Michele Mills. The Shogun's City: A History of Tokyo (1989)
 Perez, Louis G. Tokyo: Geography, History, and Culture (ABC-CLIO, 2019).
 Raz, Aviad E.  Riding the Black Ship: Japan and Tokyo Disneyland. (1999). 240 pp.
 Rozman, Gilbert. "Edo's Importance in the Changing Tokugawa Society". Journal of Japanese Studies 1974 1(1): 91–112.  in JSTOR
 Sand, Jordan. Tokyo vernacular: Common spaces, local histories, found objects (U of California Press, 2013).
 Seidensticker, Edward.  Tokyo from Edo to Showa 1867-1989: The Emergence of the World's Greatest City (2010) 650pp  excerpt and text search; previously published as  Seidensticker,  Low City, High City: Tokyo from Edo to the Earthquake (1983), and Tokyo Rising: The City since the Great Earthquake. (1990). 384 pp.  online book review 
 Siebert, Loren. "Using GIS to Document, Visualize, and Interpret Tokyo's Spatial History". Social Science History 2000 24(3): 536–574.  online 
 Smith, Henry D., II. "Tokyo as an Idea: an Exploration of Japanese Urban Thought until 1945". Journal of Japanese Studies 1978 4(1): 45–80.  in Jstor
 Weisenfeld, Gennifer. Imaging Disaster: Tokyo and the visual culture of Japan’s Great Earthquake of 1923 (Univ of California Press, 2012).

Dissertations
 Brown, Arlo Ayres, III.  "The Great Tokyo Riot: The History and Historiography of the Hibiya Incendiary Incident of 1905".  PhD dissertation Columbia U. 1986. 425 pp.  DAI 1986 47(3): 1025-A. DA8610746  Fulltext: ProQuest
 Freedman, Alisa D.  "Tracking Japanese Modernity: Commuter Trains, Streetcars, and Passengers in Tokyo Literature, 1905–1935".  PhD dissertation U. of Chicago 2002. 300 pp.  DAI 2002 63(4): 1347-A. DA3048377  Fulltext: ProQuest
 Goddard, Timothy Unverzagt. "Teito Tokyo: Empire, Modernity, and the Metropolitan Imagination." (PhD diss., UCLA, 2013) online.
 Griggs, M. Pierce.  "From Civilizing to Expertizing Bureaucracy: Changing Educational Emphasis in Government-Supported Schools of Tokyo (Edo) during the Tokugawa Period and Early Meiji Era".  PhD dissertation  U. of Chicago 1997. 303 pp.  DAI 1998 58(10): 4031-A. DA9811860  Fulltext: ProQuest
 Karacas, Cary Lee.  "Tokyo from the Fire: War, Occupation, and the Remaking of a Metropolis".  PhD dissertation U. of California, Berkeley 2006. 333 pp.   DAI 2007 67(8): 3111-A. DA3228373  Fulltext: ProQuest
 Miller, Ian Jared.  "The Nature of the Beast: The Ueno Zoological Gardens and Imperial Modernity in Japan, 1882–1945".  PhD dissertation Columbia U. 2004. 273 pp.  DAI 2007 68(1): 304-A. DA3249167  Fulltext: ProQuest
 Phillips, David Peter.  "Intersections of Modernity and Tradition: An Urban Planning History of Tokyo in the Early Meiji Period (1868–1888)".  PhD dissertation U. of Pennsylvania 1996. 241 pp.  DAI 1996 57(4): 1879-A. DA9627986  Fulltext: ProQuest
 Tajima, Kayo.  "The Marketing of Urban Human Waste in the Edo/Tokyo Metropolitan Area: 1600–1935".  PhD dissertation Tufts U. 2005. 189 pp.  DAI 2005 66(3): 1123-A. DA3167536  Fulltext: ProQuest
 Takenaka-O'Brien, Akiko.  "The Aesthetics of Mass-Persuasion: War and Architectural Sites in Tokyo, 1868–1945".  PhD dissertation Yale U. 2004. 549 pp.  DAI 2004 65(3): 730-A. DA3125312  Fulltext: ProQuest

Primary sources
 Beard, Charles, The Administration and Politics of Tokyo, (1923) online edition, political scientists survey the city after the earthquake
 Plutschow, Herbert E., ed. Reader in Edo period travel. (Global Oriental: 2006)
 Shirane, Haruo, ed. Early Modern Japanese Literature: An Anthology, 1600–1900. (2002). 1050 pp
 Smith II, Henry D. ed. Hiroshige: One Hundred Famous Views of Edo (1986), visual

External links 
History of Tokyo by Tokyo Metropolitan Government
  (timeline)
Thousands of photographs and films of Edo and Tokyo from Meji (1867) to present.
Old Tokyo - Vintage Tinted Images of the Japanese Capital City
 National Archives of Japan: Map of Meiji Tokyo, showing 11 large districts and 103 small districts on map published in 1876, (Meiji 9).